NGK may refer to :

Companies
NGK Spark Plug (日本特殊陶業株式会社, Nihon Tokushu Tōgyō kabushiki gaisha), a japanese company that manufactures spark plugs and ceramics
NGK Insulators, is a Japanese ceramics company
NGK, Inc. parent company of the Universal Wrestling Federation (Herb Abrams)

Other
NGK, Nederduitse Gereformeerde Kerk, the Dutch Reformed Church in South Africa,  a Reformed Christian denomination in South Africa.
NGK (film), (Nandha Gopalan Kumaran),  a 2019 Indian Tamil-language political action film written and directed by Selvaraghavan.